Alice Howard, 1st Countess of Wicklow (died 7 March 1807), née Alice Forward, was an Anglo-Irish peeress.

She was the daughter and heiress of William Forward of Castle Forward, County Donegal, by his wife Isabella Stewart.  On 11 August 1755 she married the politician Ralph Howard, who was later created Baron Clonmore and Viscount Wicklow. Her husband died in 1789.

On 5 December 1793 she was created Countess of Wicklow in the Peerage of Ireland, with remainder to the heirs male of her body.  Upon her death in 1807 she was succeeded by her eldest son, Robert Howard, who had already succeeded to his father's titles.

References

Year of birth unknown
1807 deaths
18th-century Anglo-Irish people
Alice
Irish countesses
Irish viscountesses
Hereditary peeresses of Ireland created by George III
1